The French National Stayers Championships are held annually. The stayers event is often known as motor-paced. It is held on a cycling track, the riders follow a motor throughout the race, the rider of the motor is known as their pacer. The event is relatively long for track racing and requires a (steep and wide) track that is suited for these high-speed events, and therefore is held separate from the French National Track Championships. The championship is an open event, in that riders of other nationalities also compete for the French title. All those listed below where nationality is not denoted, are French.

Results

References
Past Results

Cycle racing in France
National track cycling championships